United Trade Union Congress (Marxist) is a federation of trade unions in Kerala, India. UTUC(M) emerged from a 2005 split in the United Trade Union Congress (Bolshevik). UTUC(M) is politically tied to Revolutionary Socialist Party (Marxist). T.M. Prabha is the general secretary of UTUC(M).

References

Trade unions in India
National trade union centres of India
Trade unions in Kerala
Trade unions established in 2005
2005 establishments in Kerala